The 2017 World Baseball Classic (WBC) was an international professional baseball competition, composed of 16 competing nations, held from March 6 to March 22, 2017. It was the fourth iteration of the World Baseball Classic.  The first-round hosts were Seoul, Tokyo, Miami, and Zapopan. The second-round hosts were Tokyo and San Diego, and the championship round was played in Los Angeles.

Twelve of the 16 competing nations qualified based on their performance during the first round of the 2013 tournament; the remaining four nations were the winners of four qualification tournaments that took place in February, March, and September 2016. Two of the four qualifiers, Colombia and Israel, made their first appearance in the WBC, and both have secured their positions for the 2023 World Baseball Classic.

The Netherlands, Japan, Puerto Rico, and the United States advanced to the championship round. Defending champion Dominican Republic was eliminated in the second round. The United States defeated Puerto Rico to win the championship game, 8–0. Marcus Stroman was named tournament MVP. He made three starts for the U.S. and posted a 2.35 ERA in 15 total innings, including six shutout innings in the championship game.

Qualification

The top three teams from each pool of the first round of the 2013 World Baseball Classic automatically qualified.

Format
The first and second rounds of the tournament were played in round-robin format, with each team playing each other team in their pool once, as was the case in 2006. However, in an effort to reduce the likelihood that a team would be eliminated on statistical tiebreakers, the tournament schedule allowed for a seventh game at each pool-play site.

 If there is a two-way tie for first, since both teams advance, there would be no extra game. The team that won the original game between the teams would be declared the pool winner, and the other team the pool runner-up.
 If there is a three-way tie for first (all three teams being 2–1, and the last team 0–3), head-to-head results would not help to break the tie. In this case, statistics would determine the first-place team, and the other two would play to determine the pool runner-up.
 If there is a three-way tie for second (all three teams being 1–2, and the first team 3–0), statistics would determine the top two teams who would then play to determine the pool runner-up. The team ranked worst on the calculation would be eliminated.

In either of the latter cases, the statistics used to rank the tied teams were:
 Fewest runs allowed per inning of defense in head-to-head games
 Fewest earned runs allowed per inning of defense in head-to-head games
 Highest batting average in head-to-head games
 Drawing of lots

Rosters

Venues
Six stadiums were used during the main tournament:

Pools composition
Note: Numbers in parentheses indicate positions in the WBSC World Rankings at the time of the tournament.

First round

Pool A

|}

Pool A of the First Round of the 2017 World Baseball Classic was held at Gocheok Sky Dome, Seoul, South Korea from March 6 to 10, 2017, between Team Israel, the Netherlands, South Korea, and Taiwan. Pool A was a round-robin tournament. Prior to the start of the tournament, ESPN considered Team Israel, ranked 41st in the world, to be the biggest underdog in the tournament, referring to them as the "Jamaican bobsled team of the WBC".

Team Israel (3–0) and Team Netherlands (2–1) qualified for the second round, in Japan. Israel became the first baseball team to go undefeated in the first round of the WBC's main draw after entering the main draw by winning in a qualifying round.  In what NBC reported was thought to be the tallest batter-pitcher matchup in baseball history, the Dutch team's  Loek van Mil walked Israel's  Nate Freiman. Israel's catcher, Ryan Lavarnway, was named Pool A MVP, after going 5-for-9 (.556/.692/.889), with four walks, a home run, and three RBIs.

Pool B

|}

Two-time champion Japan concluded Pool B with a 3–0 record. Cuba defeated Australia to advance to the second round. In the first round, after batting .364, Japanese outfielder Yoshitomo Tsutsugoh was named the Pool B MVP.

Pool C

|}
After falling behind 5–0 in the sixth inning, Dominican Republic rallied to defeat the U.S. 7–5 in their second game. On the last day of the pool, Colombia tied their game against Dominican Republic 3–3 in the eighth on a Jorge Alfaro home run, and had a chance to win in the ninth inning, but Oscar Mercado was called out at home trying to score on a sacrifice fly. The game continued into extra innings, where Dominican Republic scored 7 runs in the 11th to win and finish the pool undefeated. The U.S. then took an early lead on Canada, winning 8–0 to claim the second berth in San Diego. Manny Machado of the Dominican Republic was named MVP for the first-round Pool C bracket of the WBC, after batting .357.

Pool D

|}

Tiebreaker game

|}

While Puerto Rico cruised in all three of its games, the fight for the other three places was extremely tight.  Italy scored 5 runs in the bottom of the 9th inning to shock Mexico in the first game, then lost an extra-inning slugfest against Venezuela.  In the final game, Mexico defeated Venezuela in another slugfest and thought they had scored enough runs to advance on tiebreakers, though this turned out not to be the case.

The first tiebreaker criterion is fewest runs allowed per defensive inning played (RA/IPD) in the games among the tied teams. Although Mexico allowed the fewest runs in those games (19, to Italy's 20, and Venezuela's 21), Mexico played fewer defensive innings (17, while the other two teams had 19) and thus had the highest average RA/IPD (1.117, to Italy's 1.053 and Venezuela's 1.105).  This occurred for two reasons: the Italy-Venezuela game went 10 innings, and Mexico was the road team while losing to Italy.  In fact, the Mexico-Italy game did go into the bottom of the 9th, in which Italy scored runs that were charged against Mexico but Mexico failed to record an out.  There was confusion during and after the Mexico-Venezuela game, with an initial calculation showing that Mexico had advanced.  Mexico filed a formal protest of its elimination, but the protest was denied.

As specified in the rules, Mexico was eliminated by the tiebreaker calculation and a tiebreaker game was played between Italy and Venezuela, which Venezuela won with a 9th-inning rally.

According to the rules as announced at the time, Mexico's last-place finish would have required it to participate in a qualifying tournament in order to re-qualify for the 2021 World Baseball Classic.  However, MLB announced in 2020 that the field of teams for the 2021 WBC would be expanded, with all 2017 WBC participants qualifying automatically and four new teams coming from qualifying tournaments.

Second round

Pool E

|}

Undefeated Japan (3–0) and the Netherlands (2–1) advanced to the semi-final round, as Israel (1–2) came in third, and Cuba (0–3) fourth.

Pool F

|}

Pool F started with Puerto Rico handing the Dominican Republic its first loss since the 2009 World Baseball Classic. Puerto Rico ended Pool F still undefeated and Venezuela was eliminated, going 0–3. The final game of the pool was a rematch between the United States and Dominican Republic to advance to the championship round. The DR took an early 2–0 lead in the first inning, but the United States came back to win 6–3 to eliminate the defending champions.

Championship round

Semifinals

|}

Final

|}

Final standings
The final standings were calculated by the WBSC for inclusion in the WBSC Men's Baseball World Rankings system.

In the final standings, ties were to be broken in the following order of priority:

 The team with the highest Team's Quality Balance (TQB=(RS/IPO)–(RA/IPD)) in all games;
 The team with the highest Earned Runs Team's Quality Balance (ER–TQB=(ERS/IPO)–(ERA/IPD)) in all games;
 The team with the highest batting average (AVG) in all games;

When the 2017 WBC was played, it was assumed that the field for the following 2021 WBC would remain 16 teams. Under the qualification format in use at the time, the bottom four finishers from 2017 (Canada, China, Mexico, and Chinese Taipei) would've been forced to re-qualify for 2021. However, in January 2020, MLB announced it was expanding the field for the 2021 WBC from 16 teams to 20 and that all 16 participants from 2017 would receive automatic bids for 2021, thus sparing the bottom four nations from relegation to the qualifiers.

2017 All-World Baseball Classic team

Source:

Attendance
973,699 (avg. 24,342; pct. 72.3%)

First round
508,830 (avg. 20,353; pct. 74.3%)
 Pool A – 52,286 (avg. 8,714; pct. 51.9%)
 Pool B – 206,534 (avg. 34,422; pct. 82.0%)
 Pool C – 163,878 (avg. 27,313; pct. 74.3%)
 Pool D – 86,132 (avg. 12,305; pct. 76.9%)

Second round
354,977 (avg. 29,581; pct. 72.0%)
 Pool E – 209,072 (avg. 34,845; pct. 83.0%)
 Pool F – 145,905 (avg. 24,318; pct. 60.5%)

Championship round
109,892 (avg. 36,631; pct. 65.4%)
 Semifinals – 58,327 (avg. 29,164; pct. 52.1%)
 Final – 51,565 (avg. 51,565; pct. 92.1%)

Statistics leaders

Batting

* Minimum 2.7 plate appearances per game

Pitching

* Minimum 0.8 innings pitched per game
** Zeid is tied with 12 others with a 0.00 ERA but he has pitched the most innings (10.0)

Most Valuable Players

First round
 Pool A –  Ryan Lavarnway
 Pool B –  Yoshitomo Tsutsugo
 Pool C –  Manny Machado
 Pool D –  Francisco Lindor

Second round
 Pool E –  Wladimir Balentien
 Pool F –  Yadier Molina

Championship round
 Tournament –  Marcus Stroman

Broadcasting

Television

Radio

References

External links
Official website

 
World Baseball Classic
World Baseball Classic
March 2017 sports events